Lee Dong-Sik  (born 15 March 1979) is a South Korean footballer who plays for Busan I'Park in the K-League.

Lee previously played for Pohang Steelers, Bucheon SK, Gwangju Sangmu Bulsajo(army) and Suwon Bluewings.

Club career statistics

External links
 
 National Team Player Record 

1979 births
Living people
Association football defenders
South Korean footballers
South Korea international footballers
Pohang Steelers players
Jeju United FC players
Gimcheon Sangmu FC players
Suwon Samsung Bluewings players
Busan IPark players
K League 1 players